Justin Heekeren (born 27 November 2000) is a German footballer who plays as a goalkeeper for Bundesliga club Schalke 04.

On 9 June 2022, he agreed to join Schalke 04, signing a three-year contract with an option for a further year.

Career statistics

References

External links
 Profile at the FC Schalke 04 website
 
 Justin Heekeren at kicker.de

2000 births
Living people
Footballers from North Rhine-Westphalia
German footballers
Association football goalkeepers
Rot-Weiß Oberhausen players
FC Schalke 04 players
FC Schalke 04 II players
Regionalliga players